Live: Omaha to Osaka is the only live album by L7. The album was recorded at clubs in Omaha, Nebraska, (first 11 songs) and Osaka, Japan, (the rest) hence its name.

Track listing

Personnel
Donita Sparks – lead vocals, guitar
Suzi Gardner – guitar, backing vocals
Gail Greenwood – bass, backing vocals
Demetra Plakas – drums, backing vocals

References

L7 (band) albums
1998 live albums
Live grunge albums
Man's Ruin Records live albums